Geoffrey G. Slaughter (born November 1, 1962) is an associate justice of the Indiana Supreme Court, appointed to that office by Governor Mike Pence in May 2016.

Early life and education 

Born in Gary, Indiana, Slaughter was raised in Crown Point, graduating from high school there in 1981. He received a Bachelor of Arts in economics with high honors from Indiana University Bloomington in 1985, followed by an Master of Business Administration in finance from the Kelley School of Business in 1989 and a Juris Doctor, cum laude, from the Indiana University Maurer School of Law in 1989.

Legal career 
Slaughter was then a law clerk to the Honorable Allen Sharp of the United States District Court for the Northern District of Indiana, stationed in South Bend. Slaughter entered private practice in Chicago, with the firm of Kirkland & Ellis, until 1995, when he became a special counsel to the Indiana Attorney General. He returned to private practice in 2001, in Indianapolis, as a partner with Taft Stettinius & Hollister, which position he held until his appointment to the Indiana Supreme Court.

References

1962 births
Living people
Indiana lawyers
Justices of the Indiana Supreme Court
Indiana University Bloomington alumni
Indiana University Maurer School of Law alumni
Kelley School of Business alumni
People associated with Kirkland & Ellis
21st-century American judges
Federalist Society members